Changmei Township is a township in Huanjiang Maonan Autonomous County, Guangxi, China.

Administrative division
As of 2021, the township is divided into one community and five villages: 
Changmei Community
Neitong
Bafu
Neidian
Guan'an
Aidong

History
The area belonged to Si'en County during the Qing dynasty (1644–1911).

In 1933 during the Republic of China, Changzhi Township was set up.

In 1950, it came under the jurisdiction of the Fifth District. In 1958, its name was changed to Da'an People's Commune. It was incorporated as a township in September 1984.

Geography
The township is situated at the eastern of Huanjiang Maonan Autonomous County. It is bordered to the north by Minglun Town and Dongxing Town, to the east by Jian'ai Township, to the south by Yizhou District, and to the west by Da'an Township.

The Zhongzhou Stream flows through the township.

Economy
The economy is supported primarily by agriculture and mineral resources. The main crops of the region are rice, followed by corn and soybean. Sugarcane is one of the important economic crops in the region. The region also has an abundance of iron, aluminum, zinc, silicon, and crystal.

Demographics

The 2019 census showed the township's population to be 15,881, an increase of 10.7% from the 2011 census.

References

Bibliography

 

Divisions of Huanjiang Maonan Autonomous County